Empress Xiaogongren (28 April 1660 – 25 June 1723), of the Manchu Plain Yellow Banner Uya clan, was a posthumous name bestowed to the consort of Xuanye, the Kangxi Emperor and mother of Yinzhen, the Yongzheng Emperor. She was honoured as Empress Dowager Renshou during the reign of her son and posthumously honoured as empress, although she never held the rank of empress consort during her lifetime.

Life

Family background
Empress Xiaogongren's personal name was not recorded in history. She was a Booi Aha of the Plain Yellow Banner by birth.

 Father: Weiwu, served as a third rank military official, and held the title of a first class duke
 Paternal grandfather: Esen
 Paternal grandmother: Lady Guwalgiya
 Mother: Lady Saiheli
 Elder sister: wife of Alingga

Shunzhi era
The future Empress Xiaogongren was born on the 19th day of the third lunar month in the 17th year of the reign of the Shunzhi Emperor, which translates to 28 April 1660 in the Gregorian calendar.

Kangxi era
In February or March 1673, Lady Uya entered the Forbidden City and became a lady-in-waiting of the Kangxi Emperor. On 13 December 1678, she gave birth to the emperor's fourth son, Yinzhen. On 15 November 1679, she was granted the title "Concubine De". On 5 March 1680, she gave birth to the emperor's sixth son, Yinzuo, who would die prematurely on 15 June 1685.

On 28 January 1682, she was elevated to "Consort De". She gave birth on 5 July 1682 to the emperor's seventh daughter, who would die prematurely in September 1682, on 10 November 1683 to his ninth daughter, Princess Wenxian of the First Rank, on 14 June 1686 to his 12th daughter, who would die prematurely in February or March 1697, and on 10 February 1688 to his 14th son, Yunti.

Yongzheng era
The Kangxi Emperor died on 20 December 1722 and was succeeded by Yinzhen, who was enthroned as the Yongzheng Emperor. As the mother of the reigning emperor, Consort De was honoured as "Empress Dowager Renshou".

Empress Dowager Renshou died of illness on 25 June 1723. Some sources claimed that she wished to commit suicide to join her husband but her son refused to let her do so. She fell ill shortly afterwards and died after refusing medical treatment. She was interred in the Jing Mausoleum of the Eastern Qing tombs. She was granted the posthumous title "Empress Xiaogongren" by the Yongzheng Emperor.

Titles
 During the reign of the Shunzhi Emperor (r. 1643–1661):
 Lady Uya (from 28 April 1660)
 During the reign of the Kangxi Emperor (r. 1661–1722):
 Concubine De (from 15 November 1679), fifth rank consort
 Consort De (from 28 January 1682), fourth rank consort
 During the reign of the Yongzheng Emperor (r. 1722–1735):
 Empress Dowager Renshou (from 20 December 1722)
 Empress Xiaogongren (from August/September 1723)

Issue
 As a mistress:
 Yinzhen (13 December 1678 – 8 October 1735), the Kangxi  Emperor's 11th (fourth) son, enthroned on 27 December 1722 as the Yongzheng Emperor
 As Concubine De:
 Yinzuo (5 March 1680 – 15 June 1685), the Kangxi Emperor's 14th (sixth) son
 As Consort De:
 The Kangxi Emperor's seventh daughter (5 July 1682 – September 1682)
 Princess Wenxian of the First Rank (10 November 1683 – August/September 1702), the Kangxi Emperor's ninth daughter
 Married Shun'anyan (d. 1724) of the Manchu Tunggiya clan in October/November 1700
 The Kangxi Emperor's 12th daughter (14 June 1686 – February/March 1697)
 Yunti (10 February 1688 – 16 February 1755), the Kangxi Emperor's 23rd (14th) son, granted the title Prince Xun of the Second Rank in 1748, posthumously honoured as Prince Xunqin of the Second Rank

In fiction and popular culture
 Portrayed by Au Yin-lin in The Rise and Fall of Qing Dynasty (1987)
 Portrayed by Sally Chen in Legend of YungChing (1997)
 Portrayed by Shi Jianlan in Yongzheng Dynasty (1999)
 Portrayed by Wu Qianqian in Huang Taizi Mishi (2004)
 Portrayed by Leanne Liu in Palace (2011), Empresses in the Palace (2011) and Palace II (2012)
 Portrayed by Dai Chunrong in Scarlet Heart (2011)
 Portrayed by Vivian Wu in The Palace (2013)
 Portrayed by Rosanne Lui in Gilded Chopsticks (2014)
 Portrayed by Luo Mi in Legend of Dragon Pearl (2017)

See also
 
 Royal and noble ranks of the Qing dynasty

Notes

References
 
 
 
 
 

1660 births
1723 deaths
Xiaogongren, Empress
Xiaogongren, Empress
17th-century Chinese women
17th-century Chinese people
18th-century Chinese women
18th-century Chinese people
Consorts of the Kangxi Emperor